Tebbutt is the surname of the following people:
Carmel Tebbutt (born 1964), Australian politician
Charles Goodman Tebbutt (1860–1944), English speedskater and bandy player 
Greg Tebbutt (born 1957), Canadian ice hockey player 
John Tebbutt (1834–1916), Australian astronomer
Tebbutt (crater) on the Moon
 11212 Tebbutt, a minor planet
Matt Tebbutt (born 1973), British chef and television food presenter 
Michael Tebbutt (born 1970), Australian former tennis player

English-language surnames